The Forrestdale and Thomsons Lakes Ramsar Site comprises two separate nature reserves, totalling  in area, protecting two shallow fresh to brackish, seasonal lakes in a suburban and agricultural landscape in south-western Western Australia. It lies in the Swan Coastal Plain bioregion and is used mainly for birdwatching and walking.  The site is recognised as being of international importance under the Ramsar Convention on Wetlands, under which it was designated Ramsar Site 481 on 7 June 1990.

Description

Both lakes usually dry out in summer, though Thomsons lake may occasionally retain water throughout the year. Both reserves contain areas of native woodland. They are the best remaining examples of brackish, seasonal lakes with extensive fringing sedgeland typical of the Swan Coastal Plain. Regionally they form a major breeding, migration stop-over and semi-permanent drought refuge area for shorebirds and other waterbirds.

Ramsar criteria satisfied by the site are that it:
 contains a representative, rare, or unique example of a natural or near-natural wetland type found within the appropriate biogeographic region;
 supports populations of a plant and/or animal species important for maintaining the biological diversity of a particular biogeographic region;
 regularly supports 20,000 or more waterbirds; and
 regularly supports 1% of the individuals in a population of one species or subspecies of waterbird.

Conservation
Conservation management of the site focuses on:
 maintenance of water quality since nutrient levels in the lakes are fairly high, and water levels may be affected by groundwater extraction for domestic and agricultural purposes, or increased drainage discharge from nearby urban areas;
 preventing the spread of Typha orientalis throughout the lakes;
 the need to control chironomid numbers because of their nuisance factor to nearby residents; and
 mitigating further deterioration of wetland and woodland vegetation resulting from over-use by visitors.

References

Notes

Sources
 
 

Nature reserves in Western Australia
Ramsar sites in Australia
Wetlands of Western Australia
Birdwatching sites in Australia